Oakdale Park is a former baseball park located in Philadelphia, Pennsylvania. The field was home to the Philadelphia Athletics professional baseball team in the first season of the American Association, 1882. The site of the park had been used for amateur baseball since the Civil War. It was used from 1877 to 1881 by the Olympic Ball Club of Philadelphia.

The 1882 Athletics played at the park, bounded by Huntingdon Street (north), 11th Street (east), Cumberland Street (south), and 12th Street (west) in the West Kensington neighborhood. The Athletics played 39 regular-season games at the park, compiling a 21–18 record. The franchise relocated to Jefferson Street Grounds in 1883. Oakdale Park was sold shortly thereafter and torn down. Philadelphia Ball Park would be built a couple of blocks west of this site, five years later.

References

External links
Map of Oakdale Park (c. 1875)
Former site of Oakdale Park

Defunct sports venues in Philadelphia
Defunct baseball venues in the United States
Baseball venues in Pennsylvania